Hector Benitez may refer to:

 Héctor Benítez (1918–2011), Venezuelan professional baseball player
 Héctor Darío Benítez (born 1980), Paraguayan professional footballer

See also 
 Benitez